Luisa Helga Gerda Niemesch (born 7 September 1995) is a German freestyle wrestler. At the 2016 Summer Olympics in Rio de Janeiro, she competed in the women's freestyle 58 kg division. She finished in 20th place after losing to Orkhon Purevdorj of Mongolia in the repechage.

Career 

In March 2021, she competed at the European Qualification Tournament in Budapest, Hungary hoping to qualify for the 2020 Summer Olympics in Tokyo, Japan. She did not qualify at this tournament and she also failed to qualify for the Olympics at the World Olympic Qualification Tournament held in Sofia, Bulgaria. In October 2021, she competed in the 62 kg event at the World Wrestling Championships held in Oslo, Norway.

In 2022, she competed at the Yasar Dogu Tournament held in Istanbul, Turkey. She won the silver medal in the 62 kg event at the 2022 European Wrestling Championships held in Budapest, Hungary. A few months later, she competed at the Matteo Pellicone Ranking Series 2022 held in Rome, Italy. She won the gold medal in her event at the 2022 Tunis Ranking Series event held in Tunis, Tunisia. She competed in the 62 kg event at the 2022 World Wrestling Championships held in Belgrade, Serbia.

She won one of the bronze medals in her event at the 2023 Ibrahim Moustafa Tournament held in Alexandria, Egypt.

Achievements

References

External links

 

1995 births
Living people
German female sport wrestlers
Wrestlers at the 2016 Summer Olympics
Olympic wrestlers of Germany
21st-century German women